Love Me Hate Me Kiss Me Kill Me is the first album by artist Fukkk Offf, released on June 8, 2009, by Coco Machete Records.

Track listing

References

2009 albums